Aleksandr Vaganov (ru)
 Leonid Valov (ru)
 Sergey Valsky (ru)
 Sergey Vandyshev (ru)
 Oleg Varlakov (ru)
 Valery Varfolomeev
 Viktor Vasenkov (ru)
 Sergey Vasilyov (ru)
 Vladimir Vasilyev (ru)
 Oleg Vasyuta (ru)
 Mikhail Vasyanin (ru)
 Ruslan Vakhitov (ru)
 Yuri Vashchuk (ru)
 Viktor Vdovkin (ru)
 Viktor Velichko (ru)
 Denis Vetchinov
 Oleg Viznyuk (ru)
 Nikolai Vinogradov (ru)
 Pavel Vinogradov
 Vladimir Vlasov (ru)
 Pavel Vlasov
 Sergey Vlasov (lieutenant colonel) (ru)
 Sergey Vlasov (major) (ru)
 Vasily Vodolazhsky (ru)
 Aleksandr Volkov (ru)
 Sergey Volkov
 Andrey Volovikov (ru)
 Nikolai Volodin (ru)
 Vladimir Volodkin (ru)
 Artur Voloshin (ru)
 Vera Voloshina
 Vitaly Volf (ru)
 Yuri Vornovsky (ru)
 Aleksey Vorobyov (ru)
 Boris Vorobyov (ru)
 Vyacheslav Vorobyov (ru)
 Dmitry Vorobyov (ru)
 Yuri Vorobyov
 Oleg Vorozhanin (ru)
 Sergey Voronin (ru)
 Andrey Voskresensky (ru)
 Igor Votintsev (ru)
 Sergey Vcherashnev (ru)

References 
 

Heroes V